Lyon-Gorge-de-Loup station (French: Gare de Lyon-Gorge-de-Loup) is a railway station in the Gorge de Loup area of western Lyon, France, mainly used by TER ARA lines towards Lyon-Saint-Paul station. It is also served by the Tram-train de l'Ouest and Line D of the Lyon Metro network.

Gallery

See also  
 Transport in Rhône-Alpes
 TER Auvergne-Rhône-Alpes
 9th arrondissement of Lyon
 Réseau Express de l'Aire urbaine Lyonnaise

References

External links 
 Timetables, TER Auvergne-Rhône-Alpes

9th arrondissement of Lyon
Gorge-de-Loup
Railway stations in France opened in 1876